The following list is a discography of production by Jim Jonsin, an American hip hop, pop and R&B music producer from South Florida. It includes a list of songs produced, co-produced and remixed by year, artist, album and title.

Singles produced

2000

Outsidaz - Night Life
 07. "Night Life"

2004

Pitbull - M.I.A.M.I. 

09. "Dammit Man" (featuring Piccalo)

Trick Daddy - Thug Matrimony: Married to the Streets 

03. "Let's Go" (co-produced by Lil Jon, featuring Twista, Lil Jon)

2005

Pretty Ricky - Bluestars 

02. "Your Body"
03. "Grind On Me"
08. "Nothing But A Number"

Jamie Foxx - Unpredictable 

01. "Unpredictable" (featuring Ludacris)

Trina - Glamorest Life 

04. "Here We Go" (featuring Kelly Rowland)

Twista - The Day After 

06. "Girl Tonite" (featuring Trey Songz)

Pitbull - Money Is Still a Major Issue 

01. "Everybody Get Up" (featuring Pretty Ricky)

2006

Danity Kane - Danity Kane 

02. "Heartbreaker" 
05. "Show Stopper" (featuring Yung Joc)

Lil Wayne & Birdman - Like Father, Like Son 

12. "Leather So Soft"

Pitbull - El Mariel 

14. "Hey You Girl"

Urban Mystic - Ghetto Revelations II 

11. "Let's Make A Change" (featuring Trick Daddy) (produced with Bigg D)

2007

Lil Wayne - The Drought Is Over 2 (The Carter 3 Sessions) 

10. "I Feel Like Dying"
 Sample Credit: Karma - "Once"

Baby Bash - Cyclone 

10. "Na Na (The Yummy Song)" (featuring Casely)

Bow Wow & Omarion - Face Off 

12. "Another Girl"

Birdman - 5 ★ Stunna 

10. "All the Time"

2008

B.o.B - Hi! My Name is B.o.B 

05. "Lonely People" (produced with B.o.B)
17. "Don't Be Afraid" (produced with B.o.B)
20. "Do Anything" (produced with B.o.B)
23. "Use Ur Love"
27. "Sweet Home"
28. "Not Love" (produced with B.o.B)
35. "Middle of the Day"

Prima J - Prima J 

03. "Tame"

Lil Wayne - Tha Carter III 

12. "Lollipop" (co-produced by Deezle, featuring Static Major)

Michelle Williams - Unexpected 

06. "The Greatest"

B.o.B - Who the F#*k is B.o.B? 

16. "Lonely People" (produced with B.o.B)
17. "Use Ur Love" (produced with B.o.B)
20. "Starship Stobelight" (produced with B.o.B)

T.I. - Paper Trail 

06. "Whatever You Like

Beyoncé - I Am... Sasha Fierce 

02. "Radio"
04. "Sweet Dreams"
05. "Save The Hero"

Soulja Boy - iSouljaBoyTellEm 

06. "Kiss Me Thru the Phone"

2009

Westlife - Where We Are

 02. "How to Break a Heart"

Slim Thug - Boss of All Bosses 

03. "I Run" 
05. "Smile"

Flo Rida - R.O.O.T.S. 

04. "Shone"

Mims - Guilt 

08. "Rock 'n Rollin" (featuring Tech N9ne)

Mike Jones - The Voice 

05. "Cuddy Buddy" (featuring Trey Songz, Lil Wayne & Twista)

Fat Joe - Jealous Ones Still Envy 2 (J.O.S.E. 2) 

07. "Porn Star" (featuring Lil' Kim)

Mario - D.N.A. 

03. "Get Out"

Pitbull - Rebelution 

08. "Hotel Room Service"
10. "Call Of The Wild
13. "Across The World" (featuring B.o.B)
16. "All About You"

Backstreet Boys - This Is Us 

06. "This Is Us"
12. "Helpless" (featuring Pitbull)
13. "On Without You"
 "Lost in Space"

Alexandra Burke - Overcome 

14. "All Night Long" (featuring Pitbull)

Amerie - In Love & War 

08. "Swag Back"

Evident 
00. "Single Girl"

Young Dro 
00. "On Fire"

2010

Trina - Amazin' 

13. "Let Dem Hoes Fight" (featuring Kalenna Harper)

Usher - Raymond v. Raymond 

03. "There Goes My Baby"
14. "Making Love (Into The Night)"

T.I. - Fuck A Mixtape 

09. "Get Yo Girl" (featuring Rich Kid Shawty)

Cypress Hill - Rise Up 

04. "Get It Anyway"
15. "Armada Latina" (featuring Pitbull & Marc Anthony)

Monica - Still Standing 

06. "Mirror"

Eminem - Recovery 

10. "Space Bound"

Kid Cudi - Man on the Moon II: The Legend of Mr. Rager 

08. "Erase Me" (featuring Kanye West)

T.I. - No Mercy 

13. "Lay Me Down" (featuring Rico Love)

Nelly - 5.0 

04. "Just a Dream"
08. "Gone" (featuring Kelly Rowland)
12. "Nothing Without Her"

N-Dubz - Love.Live.Life 

11. "Girls"

Fantasia - Back to Me 

10. "Falling in Love Tonight"

Gucci Mane - The Appeal: Georgia's Most Wanted 

15. "Grown Man" (featuring Estelle)

B.o.B - No Genre 

02. "So So"

2011

Kelly Rowland - Here I Am 

03. "Motivation" (featuring Lil Wayne)

Baby Bash - Bashtown 

10. "Good for My Money" (featuring Lloyd)

Wiz Khalifa - Rolling Papers 

2. "On My Level" (featuring Too Short)

Game - Hoodmorning (No Typo): Candy Coronas 

00. "Rough" (featuring Yelawolf)

Game - The R.E.D. Album

00. "Better Days" (Leftover track)

Jagged Edge - The Remedy 

04. "Flow Through My Veins"

Nicole Scherzinger - Killer Love 

04. "Right There"

Mary J. Blige - My Life II... The Journey Continues (Act 1) 

09. "Mr. Wrong" (featuring Drake)

Yelawolf - Radioactive 

13. "Radio"

B.o.B - E.P.I.C. (Every Play Is Crucial) 

04. "What Are We Doing"
14. "Friday Night Star"

Demrick - #HeadsUp
08. "BurnOut"

2012

Brandy - Two Eleven 

05. "No Such Thing as Too Late"

Usher - Looking 4 Myself 

06. "Lemme See" (featuring Rick Ross)
08. "Dive" (co-produced with Rico Love, Frank Romano & Danny Morris)

Wiz Khalifa - O.N.I.F.C. 

13. "Up in It" (co-produced with Earl & E, Rico Love)

2013

ASAP Rocky - Long. Live. ASAP
01. "Long Live ASAP" (co-produced with Rico Love, Finatik & Zac, Frank Romano, LORD FLACKO)

LL Cool J - Authentic
Leftover
00. "No More" (featuring Ne-Yo)

Demrick - All the Wrong Things 2
05. "Float" (co-produced with Finatik & Zac)
10. "Smoke"
11. "Perfect World"
13. "Runway"
16. "Smoke (Remix)"  (featuring Cypress Hill)

Demrick – All the Wrong Things 2: Bonus Tracks
02. "Go Out and Get It" (co-produced with Finatik & Zac)
05. "I'll Be There" (co-produced with Finatik & Zac)

ASAP Ferg - Trap Lord
10. "Murda Something" (featuring Waka Flocka Flame) (co-produced with Rico Love, Finatik & Zac)

B.o.B - Underground Luxury 
13. "Nobody Told Me" (produced with Finatik & Zac)

2014

Kevin Gates - By Any Means
08. "Go Hard"

Wiz Khalifa - Blacc Hollywood
03. "Promises"
04. "KK"

Big K.R.I.T. - Cadillactica 
06. "Pay Attention" (featuring Rico Love)

2015

ASAP Rocky - At. Long. Last. ASAP
04. "L$D" (produced with Hector Delgado and Finatik N Zac)

2018

Carrie Underwood - Cry Pretty
00. "The Champion" (featuring Ludacris)

Upcoming

Esmee Denters - Screaming Out Loud 
00. "Tonight" (featuring Matt Lennon)

References

External links
 

Production discographies
 
 
Discographies of American artists
Hip hop discographies
Pop music discographies